Nón lá (Chữ Nôm: 𥶄蘿) or nón tơi (𥶄𥵖) is a type of Vietnamese headwear used to shield the face from sun and rain. Nón lá is a typical symbol of the Vietnamese people. Nón lá is a common name for many types of hats in Vietnam, but now it is mainly used to refer to cones with pointed tips.

Nón lá appeared in the 13th century, during the Trần Dynasty.

The hats have been worn since ancient times to protect the wearer from the sunshine and rain of Vietnam's tropical monsoon climate. An image of the nón lá was carved on the Ngọc Lũ bronze drum and the Đào Thịnh bronze jar around 2500–3000 BC.

In Vietnam today, there are a number of traditional hat-making villages such as Đồng Di village (Phú Vang), Dạ Lê (Hương Thủy), Trường Giang (Nông Cống), especially Phủ Cam hat village (Huế), Chuông village (Thanh Oai - Hanoi).

Characteristics 
Nón lá are often woven with different types of leaves such as palm leaves, let leaves, straw, bamboo, mortar leaves, hồ leaves, pandan leaves, du quy diệp leaves used to make hats, etc... but mainly made of conical leaves. Hats often have a strap made of soft fabric or velvet, silk to keep on the neck.

Cones are usually conical in shape, but there are also some types of cones that are wide and flattened. The conical leaves are arranged on a frame consisting of small bamboo slats bent into an arc, pinned with thread, or silk or monofilament. The spokes are made into thin, small and supple bamboo sticks and then bent into circles of different diameters to form cones. All are arranged next to each other on a pyramidal mold.

To make a nón lá, the craftsman takes each leaf, flattens it, then cuts the top diagonally with scissors, then uses a needle to thread about 24–35 leaves together for one turn, then arrange them evenly on the hat mold. The conical leaves are thin and also easily damaged when it rains a lot, so the craftsmen took advantage of the dry bamboo sheath to make the layer between the two layers of conical leaves, making the hat both hard and durable.

In the next stage, the craftsman takes the rope to tie the conical leaves that have been spread evenly on the mold with the hat frame and then they begin to sew. The worker puts the leaves on the side of the cone and then uses a wire and a sewing needle to make the hat into a pyramid. After forming, the hat is coated with a layer of varnish to increase durability and aesthetics (can add art decoration for hats used in art). In the middle of the 3rd and 4th spokes, the worker uses only two symmetrical pairs to tie the straps. Straps are usually made from velvet, soft silk, with many colors.

Classify 

Nón lá is a common name for many other types of hats such as nón ngựa or nón Gò Găng (made in Bình Định, made of lụi leaves, often used when riding a horse); nón cụ (the type of hat that often appears in weddings in South Vietnam); nón Ba tầm (the type of hat popular in the North of Vietnam); nón bài thơ (in Huế,is a thin white conical hat with pictures or a few verses); nón dấu (caps with pointed tips of beast soldiers in the feudal period); nón rơm (hat made of hard pressed straw); nón cời (type of hat with tassels at the edge of the hat); nón gõ (hat made of straw, grafted for soldiers in the feudal period); nón lá sen (also known as nón liên diệp); nón thúng (the round conical hat is similar to the basket's basket, the idiom "nón thúng quai thao"); nón khua (caps of servants of feudal mandarins); nón chảo (the cone is round on the top like a pan upside down), ... but the most common today is used to refer to the type of cone with a pointed tip.

Uses 

Nón lá are often used to cover the sun, cover the rain, make a fan when hot. Sometimes it can be used to draw water or to store it. Today, nón lá are also considered a special gift for tourists when visiting Vietnam.

In art - cultural 
In theatrical art, nón lá appear in the girls' dance performances.

See also 
 Ba tầm
 Khăn vấn
 Việt phục
 Áo giao lĩnh
 Áo dài
 Asian conical hat

References 

Vietnamese headgear
All articles lacking sources
All articles needing copy edit